Fusarium oxysporum f.sp. lentis is a fungal plant pathogen infecting lentils.

References

External links
 USDA ARS Fungal Database

oxysporum f.sp. lentis
Fungal plant pathogens and diseases
Vegetable diseases
Forma specialis taxa